Sympistis baloghi is a moth of the family Noctuidae first described by James T. Troubridge in 2008. It is found in the US in south central New Mexico. It is known from only one female specimen.

The wingspan is about 34 mm.  Adults are on wing in June.

References

baloghi
Moths described in 2008